Lysaght may refer to:

People
John Lysaght, 1st Baron Lisle (1702–1781)
John Lysaght, 2nd Baron Lisle (1729–)
Edward Lysaght (1763–1811), Irish songwriter
Sidney Royse Lysaght (1856–1941), Irish poet
John Lysaght (1832–1895), manufacturer of sheet iron
Averil Lysaght (1905–1981), New Zealand biologist, science historian and artist
Cornelius Lysaght (b. 1965), British horse-racing correspondent

Businesses
John Lysaght (company), British iron and steel company
Lysaght, Australian steel company

Places
Mount Lysaght
Another spelling of Lysite, Wyoming

See also
MacLysaght